The Cowboy Cop is a 1926 American silent Western romance film produced by Robertson-Cole and released through Film Booking Offices of America, better known as FBO. The young female lead is played by Jean Arthur.

A copy is held at Nederlands Filmmuseum EYE Institute, Amsterdam.

Cast
 Tom Tyler – Jerry McGill
 Jean Arthur – Virginia Selby
 Ervin Renard – Count Mirski
 Frankie Darro – Frankie
 Pat Harmon – Crook #1
 Earl Haley – Crook #2

References

External links
 
 

1926 films
1926 Western (genre) films
1920s romance films
American black-and-white films
American romance films
Film Booking Offices of America films
Films based on short fiction
Films directed by Robert De Lacey
Silent American Western (genre) films
1920s American films
1920s English-language films